Richard John Bennett (born 16 February 1932; died 17 June 2011) was a Trinidad and Tobago sailor. He competed in the Flying Dutchman event at the 1960 Summer Olympics, representing the West Indies Federation. He also competed at the 1972 Summer Olympics, for Trinidad and Tobago.

References

External links
 

1932 births
2011 deaths
Trinidad and Tobago male sailors (sport)
Olympic sailors of the British West Indies
Olympic sailors of Trinidad and Tobago
Sailors at the 1960 Summer Olympics – Flying Dutchman
Sailors at the 1972 Summer Olympics – Flying Dutchman
Sportspeople from Port of Spain